Hales Island  may refer to:

 Hales Island (Massachusetts), in the United States
 Hales Island (Queensland), in Australia